The cistophorus (kistophoros) was a coin of ancient Pergamum. It was introduced shortly before 190 B.C. at that city to provide the Attalid kingdom with a substitute for Seleucid coins and the tetradrachms of Philetairos. It also came to be used by a number of other cities that were under Attalid control. These cities included Alabanda and Kibyra. It continued to be minted and circulated by the Romans with different coin types and legends, but the same weight down to the time of Hadrian, long after the kingdom was bequeathed to Rome. It owes its name to a figure, on the obverse, of the sacred chest of Dionysus.

Cistophoric standard

It was tariffed at four drachmas, but weighed only as much as three Attic drachmas (the most important weight standard of the time), 12.75 grams. In addition, the evidence of hoards suggests that it did not travel outside the area which Pergamum controlled. It is therefore probable that it was overvalued in this area.

In any case, the result was a closed monetary system similar to that in the Ptolemaic Kingdom. It is likely that this was a deliberate policy.

Design and themes

Cistophoric coinage fails to portray reigning kings in its coins. It is possible that this lack of royal iconography is the result of Attalid royal ideology. The royal coinage is mimicking itself as a federal coinage. Attalid kings were unable to portray themselves as a charismatic and militaristic authority like the other Hellenistic rulers, as the kingdom during reign of Eumenes II received much of its power practically as a Roman gift. He portrayed himself as a benefactor of the Greeks living within Asia Minor.

The types reflect the Attalid kings' claims of descent from Dionysus and Heracles. The cista mystica on the obverse represents Dionysus while the bow case on the reverse represents Heracles, whose son, Telephus, was the mythological founder of Pergamon.

See also

 List of ancient Greek monetary standards

References

External links

Cistophorus, article in Smith's Dictionary of Greek and Roman Antiquities

Coins of ancient Greece
Coins of ancient Rome